Staring at Strangers (known early in the production stage as From the Shadows) is a 2022 Spanish-Belgian film directed by Félix Viscarret adapting the Juan José Millás' novel Desde la sombra. Its cast is led by Paco León, Leonor Watling, Àlex Brendemühl and María Romanillos.

Plot 
After being fired from his job, Damián hids in an armoire. The armoire (with Damián inside) arrives to the residence of the family formed by Lucía, Fede and their teen daughter, María. From then on, Damián becomes the family's guardian angel.

Cast

Production 
It is a joint Spanish-Belgian international co-production, produced by Tornasol and Desde la Sombra Árbol A.I.E., alongside Entre Chien et Loup, with the participation of RTVE and Movistar+. Shooting began in January 2021 in Pamplona, and it had already wrapped in March 2021.

Release 
Staring at Strangers had its world premiere as the opening film of the 67th Valladolid International Film Festival (Seminci) on 22 October 2022. It is set for a 4 November 2022 theatrical release in Spain. Upon the film's release, lead actor Paco León described his character as "nearly Galician" to imply the character's introverted nature (in a deviation from the actor's traditional comedy roles), ensuingly eliciting controversy and public scrutiny.

Reception 
Beatriz Martínez of El Periódico de Catalunya rated the "strange and risky" Staring at Strangers film 4 out of 5 stars, otherwise pointing out how it is a picture "full  of findings, twists, and turns" in which the spectators somehow all become voyeurs.

Andrea G. Bermejo of Cinemanía rated the film 4 out of 5 stars, bringing attention to Leonor Watling "in the best role of her career".

María Bescós of HobbyConsolas rated Staring at Strangers with 73 points ("good"), writing that it "is a feature film with a very unpleasant protagonist, who constantly puts you in uncomfortable situations, making you wonder about the reason for his crazy situations" which "manages to oppress and intrigue you until it ends".

Accolades 

|-
| rowspan = "3" align = "center" | 2023 || 2nd Carmen Awards || Best Actor || Paco León ||  || 
|-
| 78th CEC Medals || Best Adapted Screenplay || David Muñoz, Félix Viscarret ||  || 
|-
| 37th Goya Awards || Best Adapted Screenplay || David Muñoz, Félix Viscarret ||  || 
|}

See also 
 List of Spanish films of 2022

References 

Spanish drama films
Belgian drama films
Films based on Spanish novels
Films shot in Navarre
2022 drama films
Tornasol Films films
2020s Spanish films
2020s Spanish-language films